Blanfordia simplex is a species of land snail that has an operculum, a terrestrial gastropod mollusk in the family Pomatiopsidae.

Henry Augustus Pilsbry described it as Blanfordia japonica var. simplex in 1902. He has elevated this taxon to specific level in 1903.

Distribution 
This species is endemic to Japan. It occurs widely along the Sea of Japan. The type locality is Nishigo, Uzen Province, Honshu.

It is a Near Threatened species.

Description 
Blanfordia simplex has a shell with 4.1-5.1 whorls. Pilsbry (1902) described the first whorl to be more or less worn. The color of the shell is yellowish-olivaceous. It has the lip hardly visible, only a mere trifle expanded.

The width of the shell is 3.7-4.2 mm. The height of the shell is 5.9-6.9 mm.

The shell of Blanfordia simplex is shorter and broader than that of Blanfordia bensoni.

Ecology 

This species lives on coastal dunes and in littoral forests.

References 
This article incorporates public domain text from the reference

External links 
 Pilsbry H. A. (1915). "The Japanese species of Blanfordia". The Nautilus 29(1): 1-4. page 2, figure 3, 3a.

Pomatiopsidae
Gastropods described in 1902